Nílton Rosa (born 15 March 1943) is a Brazilian former footballer.

References

1943 births
Living people
Association football forwards
Brazilian footballers
Fluminense FC players
Footballers at the 1964 Summer Olympics
Olympic footballers of Brazil